The second season of the Bungo Stray Dogs anime series is based on the manga with the same name by Kafka Asagiri and illustrated by Sango Harukawa. It is produced by Bones, directed by Takuya Igarashi and written by Yōji Enokido. While the first four episodes are based on a light novel detailing Osamu Dazai's past in the mafia, the rest follows the Armed Detective Agency in their fights against the Port Mafia and The Guild, who wish to take their member Atsushi Nakajima.

The season aired from October 6, 2016 to December 22 of the same year. It was collected in a total of six DVDs and Blu-rays in Japan from December 23, 2016 to May 26, 2017. An original video animation was bundled with the 13th limited edition manga volume, which was released on 31 August 2017. Funimation released the series in North America on September 4, 2018 A collection of the first and second seasons was released in North America on September 17, 2019. Madman Entertainment released the series in Australia on February 20, 2019.

Screen Mode sung the opening theme titled "Reason Living" while Luck Life once again sung the ending theme titled .


Episode list

Home media releases

North America

References

Bungo Stray Dogs episode lists